Safira de Wit (born c. 1989) is a beauty pageant titleholder who was crowned Miss Universe Curaçao, the official representative of the Dutch constituent country to the 2010 Miss Universe pageant.

Miss Universe Curaçao 2010
De Wit, who stands , competed as one of nine finalists in Miss Universe Curaçao 2010, held in Willemstad on November 21, 2009, where she obtained the Miss Press and Miss Beautiful Body & Face awards, eventually winning the crown and the right to represent the Dutch constituent country in Miss Universe 2010.

Miss Universe 2010
As the official representative of Curaçao to the 2010 Miss Universe pageant broadcast live from Paradise, Nevada on August 23, 2010 De Wit participated as one of the 83 delegates who vied for the crown of eventual winner, Ximena Navarrete of Mexico.

References

External links
Miss Universe Curaçao Flash website

1989 births
Living people
Miss Universe 2010 contestants
People from Willemstad